Jerguš Bača (born January 4, 1965) is a Slovak former professional ice hockey defenceman.

Career 
Bača was drafted in the seventh round, 141st overall, by the Hartford Whalers in the 1990 NHL Entry Draft. He played ten games in the National Hockey League with the Whalers: nine in the 1990–91 season and one more in the 1991–92 season. He also competed in the men's tournament at the 1994 Winter Olympics.

Career statistics

Regular season and playoffs

International

References

External links

1965 births
Living people
Czechoslovak ice hockey defencemen
Sportspeople from Liptovský Mikuláš
Hartford Whalers draft picks
Hartford Whalers players
Ice hockey players at the 1994 Winter Olympics
Leksands IF players
MHk 32 Liptovský Mikuláš players
Milwaukee Admirals (IHL) players
Olympic ice hockey players of Slovakia
Revier Löwen players
HC Košice players
HC Olomouc players
HK Dukla Trenčín players
Slovak ice hockey defencemen
Springfield Indians players
Czechoslovak expatriate sportspeople in the United States
Slovak expatriate ice hockey players in the United States
Slovak expatriate ice hockey players in Sweden
Slovak expatriate ice hockey players in the Czech Republic
Slovak expatriate ice hockey players in Germany
Czechoslovak expatriate ice hockey people